Juritzen direkte was a news related talk show that was broadcast by TVNorge in 2002 hosted by Arve Juritzen.

Every program lasted approximately 45 minutes and was ended with a 15-minute segment called arve juritzen Ukestart, where he would interview a person who would influence next weeks news.

The program premiered on 3 March 2002 and aired every Sunday.

Notable episodes
The Norwegian Church of Scientology is invited to defend their views.
Runar Søgaard talks about his views on homosexuals.

Ratings
The first episode was watched by 255,000 viewers, but only 148,000 viewers stayed until the end. The second episode was watched by 141,000 viewers.

External links
 Filmfront.no

References

TVNorge original programming
Norwegian television talk shows
2002 Norwegian television series debuts
2002 Norwegian television series endings
2000s Norwegian television series